Philip Ormrod Beale FRPSL (born c. 1925) is a British postal historian and former teacher who has written a number of books on the history of the British postal system and the postal history of West Africa.

Early life
Philip Beale received his advanced education at Magdalene College, University of Cambridge, where he read history, graduating in 1946.

Career
In 1961, Beale travelled to The Gambia where he was principal of The Gambia High School until 1966. While there he jointly organised an archaeological expedition to examine the Senegambian stone circles, the records of which are in the Royal Anthropological Institute as MS 465. He later lectured on the running of secondary schools.

Philately
Beale joined the Royal Philatelic Society London in 1968, subsequently becoming a fellow of the society. He is a specialist in the postal history of West Africa and has written a number of books relating to that area and the history of the British postal system. His The Postal Service of Sierra Leone: Its history, stamps and stationery until 1961, published by the Royal society in 1988, was described as a "work of distinguished historical scholarship". His History of the Post in England (1998) was reprinted in a new edition as England's Mail in 2005. In 2011 he collaborated with Adrian Almond and Mike Scott-Archer to produce The Corsini Letters, an authoritative account of the cache of around 3,600 letters sent to two Italian merchants in London between 1567 and 1602 that provides insights into postal arrangements at that time.

Selected publications
 The agents of the General Post Office in Fernando Po, Lagos, Madeira, Teneriffe, St. Vincent (Cape Verde Isles) and Freetown during the nineteenth century. British West Africa Study Circle, 1974. (2nd edition, 2008)
 The Postal Service of Sierra Leone: Its history, stamps and stationery until 1961. Royal Philatelic Society, London, 1988. 
 Hendy, John G. Ship Letters. Postal History Society, East Grinstead, 1997. (Editor) 
 A History of the Post in England from the Romans to the Stuarts. Ashgate, Aldershot, 1998.  (revised as England's Mail, 2005)
 West African GPO Postal Notices of the Nineteenth Century. West Africa Study Circle, 2001. (With Frank Walton) 
 West African Post Office Impression Books. West Africa Study Circle, Dronfield, 2001. (With J.J. Martin & Frank Walton) 
 England's Mail: Two Millennia of Letter Writing. Tempus, Stroud, 2005. 
 The Corsini Letters. Amberley Publishing, Stroud, 2011. (With Adrian Almond & Mike Scott-Archer)

References 

British philatelists
Living people
British non-fiction writers
Fellows of the Royal Philatelic Society London
Alumni of Magdalene College, Cambridge
Philately of Sierra Leone
1920s births
Year of birth uncertain
Gambian schoolteachers
British expatriates in the Gambia